Thunder + Lightning is American band Modey Lemon's second album and the last to be recorded without Jason Kirker in the band as he was asked to join shortly after he produced this album.

Track listing

"Crows" – 2:48
"Thunder + Lightning" – 1:46
"Enemy" – 3:35
"Predator" – 4:18
"Electronic Sorcerer" – 1:58
"Tongues (Everybody's Got One)" – 3:43
"Ants in My Hands" – 3:05
"Slow Death" – 3:24
"The Other Direction" – 3:19
"Gemini Twins" – 4:13
"The Guest" – 2:12

Personnel
Paul Quattrone – Drums
Phil Boyd – Vocals, guitar and Moog synthesizer

2003 albums
Modey Lemon albums
Birdman Records albums